Jorge Delgado Fidalgo, commonly known as Ito (born 21 April 1992), is a Spanish footballer who plays for Gimnástica de Torrelavega as a striker.

Club career
Born in Avilés, Asturias, Ito graduated from hometown's Real Avilés' youth system, and made his debuts as a senior with the reserves in 2010. He subsequently appeared for the main squad in Tercera División, always sharing minutes with the B-side.

On 3 July 2014, after scoring nine goals in the 2013–14 campaign, Ito signed a two-year deal with CD Numancia. On 23 August he played his first match as a professional, replacing Kader in the 80th minute of a 1–2 home loss against Sporting de Gijón in the Segunda División championship.

On 13 January 2015, after appearing sparingly, Ito was loaned to Avilés until June. On 17 July rescinded with his parent club, and signed for Segunda División B side Barakaldo CF hours later.

On 27 January 2017 Ito joined Levante UD, being assigned to the B-team also in the third division.

References

External links

1992 births
Living people
People from Avilés
Spanish footballers
Footballers from Asturias
Association football forwards
Segunda División players
Segunda División B players
Tercera División players
Real Avilés CF footballers
CD Numancia players
Barakaldo CF footballers
Atlético Levante UD players
Gimnástica de Torrelavega footballers